Party in the Park is the generic name given to music concerts organised by various radio stations and local authorities and groups in the United Kingdom, typically in large parks during the summer, however it is also used to refer to a family oriented event where people can literally have a Party in the Park.

Party in the Park Nanaimo 
Party in the Park Nanaimo is in the third iteration. 2018's event is headlining Madeline Merlo, JJ Shiplett and Andrew Hyatt. The inaugural Party In The Park headlined Monster Truck, One Bad Son and Girls Guns and Glory. Party In The Park Nanaimo 2017 headlined Aaron Pirchett, Lion Bear Fox and EagleEyes. The annual outdoor music festival that occurs in Nanaimo, British Columbia every June is held on the 400,000 square foot Beban Sports Fields.

Leeds' Party in the Park

Party in the Park, Leeds was an annual free event, held in Leeds on the grounds of Temple Newsam by Leeds City Council and 96.3 Radio Aire. It took place each year the day after Opera in the Park at the same location and attracted around 70,000 people.

The event started in 1994 and was headlined by Bad Boys Inc and included performances by E.Y.C.

In 2011, tickets for Party in the park were prioritised for people with a Leeds postcode since it was an event held by Leeds City Council and also had overwhelming demand for tickets from all over West Yorkshire.

It was decided in 2013 by Leeds City Council that the tickets would no longer be free due to budget restrictions. Instead, they would be priced at up to £10 each.

Finally in 2014, Leeds City Council and 96.3 Radio Aire announced that Party in the Park would be cancelled due to a lack of funds. The concert has not returned since.

Previous artists to perform:
Westlife, Busted, McFly, Forbidden JUiCE, Olly Murs, The Wanted, Kelly Rowland, Peter Andre, JLS, Ricky Martin, E.Y.C., MN8, Deuce, 911, B*Witched, Louise Redknapp, Bad Boys Inc, Let Loose, Ultimate Kaos, Kavana, 5ive, Scouting for Girls, The Saturdays, Jason Donovan, Craig David, Damage, Pixie Lott, Girls Aloud, The Baseballs, Chicane, Ross Copperman, Alesha Dixon, Cher Lloyd, Jay Sean, Shayne Ward, Alexandra Burke, Alyssa Reid, Arctic Monkeys, Conor Maynard, Cover Drive, DJ Fresh, Labrinth, Little Mix, Marcus Collins, One Direction, Professor Green, Stooshe, Tulisa Contostavlos, Wretch 32, Inna.

Former events

Global Radio's Party in the Park
Party in the Park was a fundraiser event for the Prince's Trust, but was cancelled in 2005 due to the Live 8 concerts, when the Prince's Trust received £1.6 million in compensation from the Live 8 text message hotline.

Londonin Hyde Park, London by 95.8 Capital FM
Brightonin Preston Park by Southern FM
Cardiffin Bute Park by Red Dragon FM
Kentin The Hop Farm Country Park by Invicta FM
Oxfordin South Park by Fox FM
Southamptonon Southampton Common by Power FM, called Power in the Park

UTV Radio's Party in the Park
Party in the Park was cancelled in 2006 by UTV Radio, due to an insight of the recession in the United Kingdom.

Bradford by The Pulse of West Yorkshire
Stoke-on-Trent in Britannia Stadium by Signal 1
Swansea in Singleton Park by 96.4 The Wave

Orion Media's Party in the Park
Birminghamin Cannon Hill Park by 96.4FM BRMB (due to BRMB's sale to Orion Media, Party in the Park was going to be reintroduced to Birmingham in 2010 but was axed in favour of brmb Live at the LG Arena in November 2010)

Performers who have participated in the Hyde Park event

2004

Alanis Morissette
Anastacia
Avril Lavigne
Beverley Knight
Blue
Busted
Darren Hayes
Jamelia
Lemar
Lenny Kravitz
Lionel Richie
Matt Goss
McFly
Natasha Bedingfield
Nelly Furtado
Peter Andre
Sean Paul
Shapeshifters
Sugababes
The Calling
The Corrs
Will Young

2003

Atomic Kitten
Avril Lavigne
Beyoncé
Blue
Busted
Craig David
Daniel Bedingfield
Dannii Minogue
David Gray
Emma Bunton
Gareth Gates
Girls Aloud
Kym Marsh
Liberty X
Meat Loaf
Melanie C
Mis-Teeq
Nelly Furtado
Shania Twain
Simply Red
Sugababes

2002

A1
Ashanti
Atomic Kitten
Beverley Knight
Blue
Bryan Adams
The Calling
Darius Danesh
Darren Hayes
Enrique Iglesias
Gabrielle
Gareth Gates
Ja Rule
Liberty X
Lighthouse Family
Michelle Branch
Mis-Teeq
Natalie Imbruglia
Ronan Keating
Shaggy and Rayvon
Shakira
Sophie Ellis-Bextor
Westlife
Will Young
Wyclef Jean

2001

A1
Anastacia
Architechs
Atomic Kitten
BBMak
Blue
Catatonia
Craig David
Damage
David Gray
Destiny's Child
Eddy Grant
Emma Bunton
Geri Halliwell
Hear'Say
Jamiroquai
Lil Bow Wow
Nelly Furtado
Ricky Martin
Ronan Keating
Shaggy and Rayvon
Sisqó
Sugababes
Tom Jones
Usher
Wheatus
Wyclef Jean

2000

All Saints
Backstreet Boys
Billie Piper
Bon Jovi
Bryan Adams
Christina Aguilera
The Corrs
Craig David
Destiny's Child
Dumdums
Elton John
5ive
Honeyz
Kylie Minogue
Lionel Richie
Marti Pellow
Martine McCutcheon
Melanie C
Moloko
Queen
Ronan Keating
Savage Garden
Sisqó
Sonique
Steps
Suggs
Travis
Truesteppers & Dane Bowers featuring Victoria Beckham
Westlife

1999

Adam Rickett
Blondie
The Brand New Heavies
The Corrs
Culture Club
Elvis Costello
Eurythmics
Gary Barlow
Geri Halliwell
Honeyz
Madness
Mark Morrison and Conner Reeves
Martine McCutcheon
Mike + The Mechanics
Ricky Martin
Ronan Keating
Roxette
S Club 7
Shania Twain
Steps
Texas
UB40
Westlife

1998

All Saints
Boyzone
Del Amitri
Des'ree
Eternal
Gary Barlow
Julian Lennon
Lionel Richie
Louise
Lutricia McNeal
Natalie Imbruglia
Shania Twain
The Mavericks
DJ AfroNick
Tom Jones
Ultra Nate

See also
List of music festivals in the United Kingdom
Benefit concert

References

Benefit concerts in the United Kingdom
Music festivals in the United Kingdom